The Armed Forces of Montenegro are the military forces of Montenegro. The Armed Forces consists of an army, navy and air force.

The military currently maintains a force of 2,350 active duty members. The bulk of its equipment and forces were inherited from the Armed Forces of Serbia and Montenegro; as Montenegro contained the entire coastline of the former union, it retained the entire naval force.

In June 2017, Montenegro joined NATO as the twenty-ninth member.

Command

Leadership
Commander in Chief President Milo Đukanović

Ministry of Defence
Minister of Defence, Filip Adžić (acting)
Chief of General Staff Brigadier General, Milutin Đurović

Bases

Air Bases
Golubovci Airbase (Podgorica)

Naval Bases
Bar Naval Base
Pero Ćetković Base
Pristan Base

Army Bases
Milovan Šaranović Army Base
Nikšić Army Base
V. K. Volođa Army Base
Breza Army Base
Masline Army Base
Аndrijevica Army Base

Units and structure

  General Staff, in Podgorica
  1st Infantry Battalion, in Danilovgrad
 1st Infantry Company, in Nikšić
 2nd Infantry Company, in Pljevlja
 3nd Infantry Company, in Andrijevica
 Mountain Infantry Company, in Kolašin
 Fire Support Company, in Podgorica
 Signal Platoon, in Danilovgrad
 NBC Defence Platoon, in Danilovgrad
 Service Section, in Danilovgrad
  Air Force, at Podgorica Airbase
 Flying Squadron
 Air Surveillance & Reporting Centre, in Golubovci, reports to NATO's Integrated Air Defense System CAOC Torrejón in Spain
 Support Company
 Signal Platoon
 1st Air-Defence Platoon
 2nd Air-Defence Platoon
 Service Section
  Navy, in Bar
 Patrol Boat P105
 Patrol Boat P106
 Coastal Surveillance Company
 Training Ship "Jadran"
 Auxiliary Boats Detachment
 Support Company, in Danilovgrad
 Combat Support Battalion, in Podgorica
  Special Forces Company
 Marine Detachment
  Military Police Company
  Honorary Guard Company
 Support Battalion, in Danilovgrad
 Engineer Company
 Maintenance Company
 Mixed Logistic Company
 Warehouse Platoon
 Logistic Platoon
 2nd Infantry Battalion (Reserve), in Pljevlja
 3rd Infantry Battalion (Reserve), in Andrijevica
 Mixed Artillery Battalion (Reserve), in Nikšić
 Training Center, in Danilovgrad
 Medical Center, in Podgorica
 Signal and Electronic Warfare Company, in Podgorica

Ranks and insignia

The military before 1918

After military successes in the wars 1876–1878 during which the Principality of Montenegro was enlarged by a large territory, from the Tara River in the north to the Adriatic Sea in the south (liberated towns Podgorica, Nikšić, Kolašin, Andrijevica, Bar and Ulcinj), reorganization in Montenegrin army was conducted in 1880. Each kapetanija (municipality) formed its reserve battalion. There were 42 battalions in total. Since 1881, regular military exercises were conducted.

Supreme Commander of the Montenegrin army was the monarch, Prince / King Nikola I. Operational command, organization and financial support of the Montenegrin army was entrusted to the Ministry of Defence, the department of the Government of the Principality / Kingdom of Montenegro.

General Staff of the Montenegrin army was part of the Ministry of Defence.

In 1882 first 14 Montenegrins were sent to officer schools abroad, particularly in Italy and Russia. In 1886, 10 of them completed their education and they become first trained officers in Montenegrin warrior history. These Montenegrin officers held courses in Podgorica, Nikšić and Cetinje.

In September 1895, the first permanent Infantry NCO school in Podgorica was opened, and the first NCOs got desečar rank.
At the end of 1896, artillery officer school in Cetinje was established – the first Montenegrin officer school.

Formations

In 1906 Montenegrin army received the first systematized regulations, and the Law on Organization of the Army was adopted in 1910. Infantry and artillery, were established, followed by two specialized branches (reconnaissance and pioneering), and additional branches (medics, military workshop, the military court staff, gendarmerie and logistics).

In 1913 the Montenegrin gendarmerie became a special Military Police unit.

Since the establishment of the internal Montenegrin telecommunications system in 1869, vital for the flow of military-defence information, it was under the jurisdiction of Ministry of the military.

Until 1912, the territory of the Kingdom of Montenegro was divided into four divisional areas:

1.Cetinje divisional area
2.Podgorica divisional area
3.Nikšić divisional area
4.Kolašin divisional area
After wars 1912th–1913th established additional two divisions field:
5.Pljevlja divisional area
6.Peć divisional area
By 1912, the Montenegrin Army had 11 brigade areas, 52 districts and 322 battalion troop areas. Divisions were composed of 2–3 Infantry Brigade.

Each divisional command had three artillery batteries. On the eve of the First Balkan War Kingdom of Montenegro lined up 55,000 soldiers.

After the establishment of the Kingdom of Montenegro in 1910, Montenegro was involved in three wars with the first one being the First Balkan War, in alliance with Serbia, Greece, Romania, and Bulgaria against the Ottoman Empire. The Second Balkan War was fought between Montenegro, Serbia, Greece, Romania and the Ottoman Empire against Bulgaria, with Bulgaria consequently losing significant territory in the north, Thrace, and Macedonia.

The Military of Montenegro before 1918, was much larger than today's military. During World War I, Montenegro mobilised 50,000 troops. The Commander-in-Chief was King Nikola I of Montenegro, while the General of Staff was Božidar Janković. Units included:
Pljevlja Division
The Pljevlja Division was commanded by Brigadier Luka Gojnić. The division was made up of 10 battalions. It had around 6,000 soldiers and patrolled the area east from Pljevlja.
Herzegovina Detachment
The Herzegovina Detachment was commanded by Serdar (Count) Janko Vukotić. The detachment was made up of 15 battalions. It had around 15,000 soldiers, and patrolled the border with Herzegovina.
Lovćen Detachment
The Lovćen Detachment was commanded by divizijar Mitar Martinović. The detachment was made up of 18 battalions. It had around 8,000 soldiers, and patrolled the areas of Lovćen and Sutorman.
Old Serbia' Detachment
The 'Old Serbia' Detachment was commanded by Brigadier Radomir Vešović. The detachment was made up of 13 battalions. It had around 6,000 soldiers and secured the Albanian border.

Uniforms
Most soldiers of the Montenegrin army had no uniforms. At mobilization, the soldiers were issued with a rifle and a badge to put on the cap. Both soldiers and officers in the reserve wore national costume. The badges in the caps had different designs depending on the rank of the wearer.

Ranks and Badges
All Montenegrins between 18 and 62 years were conscripts. Recruitment was done three times a year, and the recruits are in peacetime had to have at least 25 years.
Officer ranks were: potporučnik, poručnik, kapetan, komandir, brigadir, divizijar
NCO ranks were: desečar, donarednik, narednik
Ceremonial ranks were: serdar, vojvoda

Peacekeeping operations
Montenegro participates in peace operations under the NATO and UN auspices as military troops and observers. Minister of Defense said that 85 soldiers are trained for international missions. Montenegrin soldiers are trained by the German Bundeswehr.

Montenegro sent 45 troops and medical personnel to the ISAF mission in Afghanistan and later took part in the Resolute Support Mission.

Montenegro also participates in UN peacekeeping missions in Liberia, UNMIL, Cyprus, UNFICYP as military observers and Somalia, EU-NAVFOR.

Equipment

Ground Army

Navy

Air Force

Gallery

See also
Law enforcement in Montenegro
List of wars involving Montenegro

References

External links

Official Website (Montenegrin)
Montenegro in NATO (Montenegrin)
"Europe’s Newest State Trims the Army" (DefenseNews.com)
"Appointment of the Acting Chief of the General Staff of the Army of Montenegro" (Website of the President of Montenegro)
 Montenegrin Armed Forces / Vojska Crne Gore – VCG
 Perspective of the Military of Montenegro, in English
 Montenegrin Armed Forces before 1918 / Vojska Crne Gore prije 1918
 Debate on NATO in Montenegro
 Milo Đukanović appoints himself as Minister of Defense
 / Forum article about Montenegrin military